In a Tender Mood is an album recorded by American jazz saxophonist Johnny Hodges featuring performances recorded in 1951 and 1952 and released on the Norgran label.

Track listing
All compositions by Johnny Hodges except as indicated
 "Who's Excited" (Johnny Hodges, Mercer Ellington) - 3:05
 "Standing Room Only" - 2:48
 "What's I'm Gotchere" (Edith Cue) - 3:56
 "Sweet Georgia Brown" (Ben Bernie, Maceo Pinkard, Kenneth Casey) - 6:01
 "Duke's Blues" - 6:08
 "Tenderly" (Walter Gross, Jack Lawrence) - 3:21
 "Tea for Two" (Vincent Youmans, Irving Caesar) - 3:00
 "Nothin' Yet" (Emmett Berry) - 2:42
Recorded in New York City on January 13, 1952 (track 1) and January 17, 1952 (track 2), and in San Francisco, CA on March 25, 1952 (tracks 4-7) and July 17, 1952 (tracks 3 & 8).

Personnel
Johnny Hodges - alto saxophone
Emmett Berry - trumpet
Lawrence Brown - trombone
Flip Phillips (tracks 3 & 8), Al Sears (tracks 1, 2 & 4-7) - tenor saxophone
Leroy Lovett - piano
Red Callender (tracks 3 & 8), Barney Richmond (tracks 4-7), Lloyd Trotman (tracks 1 & 2) - bass
J. C. Heard (tracks 3 & 8),   Joe Marshall (tracks 1, 2 & 4-7)  - drums

References

Johnny Hodges albums
1955 albums
Norgran Records albums
Albums produced by Norman Granz